The Ohio State Buckeyes represented Ohio State University in WCHA women's ice hockey. The Buckeyes will attempt to qualify for the NCAA tournament for the first time in school history.

Offseason

Recruiting

Transfers

Regular season

Standings

Schedule

Conference record

Roster

Awards and honors
Chelsea Knapp, WCHA Defensive Player of the Week (Week of October 10, 2012)
Paige Semenza, WCHA Player of the Week (Week of October 25, 2012)

References

Ohio State Buckeyes women's ice hockey seasons
Ohio State Buckeyes
Ohio State Buckeyes
Ohio State Buckeyes